The Body-Hat Syndrome is the third album from the rap group Digital Underground.

The album's second single, an anti-racism cultural awareness politico called "Wussup Wit the Luv," features a solo from the Funkadelic guitarist Michael Hampton, as well as a verse and video appearance by Tupac Shakur. This was the last time Shakur appeared on any Digital Underground release. Rappers Saafir and Clee were added to the line-up.

The album also contains "The Humpty Dance Awards," the group's humorous shout-out to the many artists who sampled "The Humpty Dance" before 1993. Since then the list has grown to over 50 artists (see "The Humpty Dance").

Critical reception
The Boston Globe called The Body-Hat Syndrome one of 1993's best hip hop albums. Trouser Press wrote: "Musically, Digital Underground is back at the top of its game, but conceptually the group is sounding the retreat."

Track listing
"The Return of the Crazy One"                        (4:39)
"Doo Woo You"                                             (7:37)
"Holly Wanstaho"                                           (3:35)
"Bran Nu Swetta"                                           (4:59)
"The Humpty Dance Awards"                          (4:51)
"Body-Hats, Pt. 1"                                          (1:36)
"Dope-a-Delic (Do-U-B-leeve-in-d-Flo?)"         (4:08)
"Intermission"                                                 (0:54)
"Wussup wit the Luv" (Featuring 2Pac)                                     (6:36)
"Digital Lover"                                               (4:39)
"Carry the Way (Along Time)"                         (4:16)
"Body-Hats, Pt. 2"                                          (1:32)
"Circus Entrance"                                           (1:55)
"Jerkit Circus"                                                (4:51)
"Circus Exit (The After-Nut)"                          (0:43)
"Shake & Bake"                                              (4:35)
"Body-Hats, Pt. 3"                                           (3:08)
"Do Ya Like It Dirty?"                                     (4:45)
"Bran Nu Sweat This Beat"                               (0:34)
"Wheee!"                                                        (5:09)

Note: The "Special Italian Vinyl Version" of the album, which is the only LP version containing the original picture sleeve and comic insert, & all cassette versions of the album omit THREE songs from the tracklisting: The Humpty Dance Awards, Dope-a-Delic (Do-U-B-leeve-in-d-Flo?) and Wheee!

Samples
Return of the Crazy One
"Sing a Simple Song" by Sly & the Family Stone
"Up for the Down Stroke" by Parliament
"Aqua Boogie (A Psychoalphadiscobetabioaquadoloop)" by Parliament
Wussup Wit the Luv
"Long Red" by Mountain
"Funky President" by James Brown
"The Ballad of Dorothy Parker" by Prince
Dope-a-delic (Do-u-b-leeve-in-d-flo?)
"It's Been a Long Time" by New Birth
"Mothership Connection (Live)" by Parliament
"Trombipulation" by Parliament
"Atomic Dog" by George Clinton

References

1993 albums
Digital Underground albums
Tupac Shakur
Tommy Boy Records albums
T.N.T. Recording albums